Claudiana Ayo Cole is a Gambian politician, civil servant and educationalist who is the current Minister of Basic and Secondary Education in President Adama Barrow's cabinet.

Early life and education 
Cole was the recipient of a Commonwealth Scholarship to study a Master of Education degree at Newcastle University.

Professional and political career 
Cole worked as the regional education director in the Upper River Region, officially Regional Education Directorate 6. In September 2014, Cole appeared in Brikama Magistrates’ Court in a dispute over President's Empowerment of Girls' Education Project (PEGEP) funding for female education at Model Senior Secondary School. In November 2015, she visited the Nasir Ahmadiyya Senior Secondary School and ordered it to be temporarily closed after members of the 'Green Youth' occupied it. Speaking in July 2016, she said that education "is about giving a person or a group of people the power and status in society. A group of people who unfortunately up to a little more than a decade ago were made to believe that their place was not in the school, but in the home and in the kitchen. While we understand that the home is usually considered as the first school for all humans, it is imperative that we move from the home to a formal schooling with a higher standard of learning involving organised processes; processes which provide a holistic development of the learner; cognitive and analytical."

On 22 February 2017, newly elected President of the Gambia Adama Barrow appointed Cole as Minister of Basic and Secondary Education.

References 

Living people
Government ministers of the Gambia
Women government ministers of the Gambia
Alumni of Newcastle University
21st-century Gambian women politicians
21st-century Gambian politicians
Year of birth missing (living people)